Odo I (also Hodo, Uodo, or Udo in contemporary Latin; died 25 May 834) was the Count of Orléans (comes Aurelianensium) following the final deposition of Matfrid until his own deposition a few years later.

He belonged to the Udalriching family and was a son of Adrian, who had also held the county of Orléans, and possibly of Waldrada, a Nibelungid. Odo first appears as an imperial legate to the Eastern Saxons in 810, when he was captured by the Wilzi. In 811, as count (comes), according to the Annales Fuldenses, he signed a peace treaty with the Vikings.

According to the Vita Hludowici, in 827, he was named to replace the deposed Matfrid in Orléans. Odo, along with Heribert, a relative, possibly his cousin, were exiled in April 830 by Lothair I and Orléans confiscated. Matfrid was reinstated.

In 834, while fighting Matfrid and Lambert I of Nantes, partisans of Lothair, Odo was killed as were his brothers William, Guy of Maine, and Theodo, abbot of Saint Martin of Tours.

Odo's wife was Engeltrude de Fézensac. Their eldest daughter, Ermentrude, married Charles the Bald of West Francia. He left a son William who was executed by his own brother-in-law in 866.

References

Sources

Udalriching dynasty
8th-century births
834 deaths

Year of birth unknown
Counts of Orléans
9th-century French people